Jerry O' is an American television talk show  hosted by actor Jerry O'Connell. He used The Wendy Williams Show studio to record the show as a test pilot.

The show was only broadcast 15 episodes (all in August 2019).  Wendy Williams at the beginning for her own Season 11 said that the show had not been picked up.  Her producer at the time said that Debmar-Mercury was still trying to sell the show. Unfortunately, the show was not picked up.

References

2019 American television series debuts
2010s American television talk shows
First-run syndicated television programs in the United States